Tuckabum Creek is a stream in the U.S. states of Alabama and Mississippi.

Tuckabum is a name derived from the Choctaw language purported to mean either (sources vary) "first" or "stream bed", but the meaning can not be known with certainty. Variant names are "Tickabum Creek", "Tuckabunne Creek", "Tuckaburne Creek", and "Tuckalum Creek".

References

Rivers of Alabama
Rivers of Choctaw County, Alabama
Rivers of Mississippi
Rivers of Lauderdale County, Mississippi
Alabama placenames of Native American origin
Mississippi placenames of Native American origin